The  Syro-Malabar Catholic Eparchy of Mananthavady  is an Eastern Catholic eparchy in India, under the Syro-Malabar Catholic Church. It was established in 1973 by Pope Paul VI. It is a suffragan diocese of the Syro-Malabar Catholic Archdiocese of Tellicherry, the bishop of the diocese is  Jose Porunnedom.

History
The eparchy of Mananthavady was erected by Pope Paul VI, by the Bull Quanta Gloria of 1 March 1973 bifurcating the vast diocese of Tellicherry. The diocese of Tellicherry and Mananthavady were erected for the migrated peoples from the central Kerala. Population explosion and the shortage of food during the post-war period (1945-1960) induced them to migrate to the uninhabited fertile lands of northern Kerala and to some isolated pockets of Tamil Nadu and Karnataka States. These places were filled with thick forests and under the threat of malaria and other diseases. The migrated people, being agrarian, risking their own life cleared the forests and settled themselves cultivating paddy, rubber, coconut, coffee, cashew, pepper etc...

The eparchy of Mananthavady comprises the civil districts of Wayanad and parts of the civil districts of Malapuram and Kannur in Kerala, the Nilgiris district in Tamil Nadu and the districts of Chickmangalore, Hassan, Mandya, Mysore, and Chamarajnagar in Karnataka. Of these, the district of Mandya is entrusted to the pastoral care of the Missionary Society of St. Thomas (MST), the district of Hassan to the Congregation of the Carmelites of Mary Immaculate (CMI) and the district of Chickmangalore to the Norbertine Fathers (O.Pream). The Catholic population is mainly concentrated in Kerala, while Karnataka and Tamil Nadu regions are considered Diaspora. The eparchy has an area of approximately 37, 697 km2 and a population of 1,65,100 Syrian Catholics. At present there are 143 parishes, 17 independent stations and 37 mission stations.

Mar Jacob Thoomkuzhy (archbishop emeritus of Thrissur) was consecrated as the first bishop of Mananthavady on 1 May 1973. After 22 years of able guidance, on 7 June 1995 he was transferred to the diocese of Thamarassery. The then Protosyncellus Msgr. Joseph Kaniamattam was appointed by the Major Archbishop as the Administrator of the eparchy on 27 July 1995. On 26 January 1997 Bishop Emmanuel Pothanamuzhy CMI was consecrated the second bishop of the eparchy. After the demise of Bishop Pothanamuzhy on 6 April 2003, Proto-syncellus Msgr. George Njaralakkatt was appointed the administrator of the eparchy. The present bishop Mar Jose Porunnedom was appointed on 18 March 2004 and was consecrated the third bishop of Mananthavady on 15 May 2004 and took charge of the office on the same day.

The diocese of Mananthavady was bifurcated and new diocese namely Bhadravathi was erected on 21 August 2007. The bishop of the diocese of Bhadravathi is Mar Joseph Arumachadath MCBS.

The diocese of Mananthavady was again bifurcated and a new diocese namely Mandya was erected on 18 January 2010. The first bishop of the newly erected diocese Mandya was Mar George Njaralakatt, the later archbishop of Tellicherry.

Bishops
Mar Jacob Thoomkuzhy (1 March 1973–18 May 1995)
Mar Emmanuel Giles Pothanamuzhi (11 November 1996–6 April 2003)
Mar Jose Porunnedom (18 March 2004–present)
Mar Alex Tharamangalam (Auxiliary Bishop)(1 November 2022–present)

Saints and causes for canonisation
 Fr. Armond Madhavath

References

External links
Diocese of Mananthavady
Catholic-Hierarchy entry

Mananthavady
Archdiocese of Tellicherry
Mananthavady
Christian organizations established in 1973
Roman Catholic dioceses and prelatures established in the 20th century
Dioceses in Kerala
1973 establishments in India